Nicolas Eiter (born 4 February 1996) is a German footballer who plays as a centre-back for TuS Bersenbrück.

Career
Eiter made his professional debut for VfL Osnabrück in the 3. Liga on 18 February 2015, coming on as a substitute in the 52nd minute for David Pisot in the 0–4 home loss against Arminia Bielefeld.

References

External links
 Profile at DFB.de
 Profile at kicker.de

1996 births
Living people
People from Ibbenbüren
Sportspeople from Münster (region)
Footballers from North Rhine-Westphalia
German footballers
Association football central defenders
VfL Osnabrück players
VfB Oldenburg players
3. Liga players
Regionalliga players